Austins Ferry is a residential locality in the local government area (LGA) of Glenorchy in the Hobart LGA region of Tasmania. The 2021 census recorded a population of 2,395 for Austins Ferry. It is a suburb of Hobart.

History 
Austins Ferry was gazetted as a locality in 1960.

Austins Ferry is named after James Austin (1776–1831), who had been transported to Port Phillip as a convict in 1803 along with his cousin John Earl, and arrived in Van Diemens Land in 1804. After their sentences expired both men were given small land grants on the western shore of the River Derwent between Hobart and New Norfolk.  In 1818 they established a ferry service across the river and later a punt which proved very conveniently located for vehicular traffic travelling between Hobart and regions to the north, and became very wealthy. In 1821 the visiting Governor Lachlan Macquarie renamed the village Roseneath, but it has since reverted to its original name. James Austin's original cottage (picture on the right) is preserved as a tourist attraction. The opening hours for the cottage are limited to Sundays between 1pm and 4pm, it provides crafts and historical information.

Austins Ferry is the location of St Virgil's College.

Geography
The waters of the River Derwent form the eastern boundary and parts of the northern and southern.

Road infrastructure 
National Route 1 (Brooker Highway) passes to the west. From there, several roads provide access to the locality.

References

Suburbs of Hobart
Towns in Tasmania
Localities of City of Glenorchy